Faust (English: "fist") are a German rock band from Hamburg. Formed in 1971 by producer and former music journalist Uwe Nettelbeck, the group was originally composed of Werner "Zappi" Diermaier (b.1949), Hans Joachim Irmler (b.1950), Arnulf Meifert, Jean-Hervé Péron (b.1949), Rudolf Sosna (1946 – 1996) and Gunther Wüsthoff, working with engineer Kurt Graupner. Their work was oriented around dissonance, improvisation, and experimental electronic approaches, and would influence subsequent ambient and industrial music. They are considered a central act of West Germany's 1970s krautrock movement.

History

1971–1975
Faust formed in 1971 in the rural setting of Wümme. They secured a recording contract with Polydor and soon began recording their debut, Faust, which sold poorly but received critical acclaim for its innovative approach and established a devoted fan base. Meifert was sacked shortly afterwards because, as Peron wrote in 2004, "he discussed things, because he had flat buttocks and an absolutely beautiful girlfriend, because he practised every day, because he always kept his room neat and woke up every morning to first wet a cloth he'd put in front of his room to keep the dirt out, because he played such a hard 4/4th that we had to travel into the tongue, ready to drop, ding dong is handsome top."

In 1972 the band recorded its second, slightly more accessible album So Far. Faust became one of the premier bands in the international appreciation of the genre that would eventually be known as krautrock.

Faust became one of the first acts to sign to Richard Branson's Virgin Records, who embarked on a marketing campaign somewhat daring for its time, aimed at introducing Faust to British record-buyers. The Faust Tapes was a cut-and-paste album, which spliced together a large number of bits and pieces from their extensive collection of private recordings not originally intended for release. Virgin issued it at the then price of a single, 48 pence.  The Faust Tapes reportedly sold over 100,000 copies but its low price tag rendered it ineligible for a chart placing.

After collaborating with Tony Conrad on the album Outside the Dream Syndicate, Faust recorded Faust IV at Virgin's studios in England. The band broke up in 1975 after Virgin rejected its fifth album (some of the recordings later appeared on the Munich and Elsewhere album), but reissues of their recordings and various additional material through Chris Cutler's Recommended Records maintained a level of interest.

Faust experimented with the presentation of their early records. Their first album was originally released on clear vinyl, in a clear sleeve with an X-ray of a human fist silkscreened on the outer sleeve. Their second album, So Far, made extensive use of the color black, though inside the sleeve were sheets with a different illustration for each song. The Faust Tapes had a visually unsettling op art cover design by Bridget Riley, while that for Faust IV consisted of a series of blank music staves.

1975–present: breakup, "disappearance" and reunion

After Faust's breakup, the group's whereabouts were unknown; the Recommended Records catalogues talked about the group's "disappearance". The official Web site lists three concerts during the 1980s, and the "Patchwork" album, a compilation of outtakes, feature three snippets that were recorded in the 1980s, but apart from that, the group's activities between 1975 and 1990 remain shrouded in mystery.

In 1990 and 1992, members Irmler, Diermaier and Péron reunited for performances. In 1994, Faust toured the United States for the first time, with Péron and Diermaier assisted by Steven Wray Lobdell and with members of Sonic Youth as an opening act. Irmler did not participate in the 1994 US tour, but took a more active role after that, producing the groups' records and releasing them on his Klangbad label. He also compiled and edited the "Patchwork" remix album in 2002. Sosna's chronic alcoholism ended a brief reunion with Faust "after four or five exhausting days", and he died on 10 November 1996. Gunter Wüsthoff has not taken part in any of the reunions. They have continued to perform in various combinations and with various additional musicians ever since, with Diermaier always behind the drum kit.

In 1996, Diermaier and Péron met Olivier Manchion and Amaury Cambuzat from French group Ulan Bator. They performed for the first time together as "Collectif Met(z)" in November 1996 (this quartet became the basis of a later Faust line-up and this concert was part of a 2005 release). A few days after, Faust performed at the Garage in London and at the Transmusicales de Rennes, featuring Chris Cutler.

After two studio albums, Péron left the group in June 1997. From mid-1997 to 2004, Faust toured as Zappi W. Diermaier, Hans Joachim Irmler, Steven Wray Lobdell, Lars Paukstat and Michael Stoll, releasing many more studio and live albums.

Diermaier and "art-errorist" Péron reunited in 2005, when Zappi proposed that they start a "new" Faust together with Olivier Manchion and Amaury Cambuzat from Ulan Bator. Faust now exists in two completely different incarnations, both active and each reflecting different aspects of the original group. Uwe Nettelbeck died on 17 January 2007.

Diermaier/Péron's new Faust made their debut at the 2005 Art-Errorist Avant Garde festival in Schiphorst, Germany, where they also presented a new release entitled Collectif Met(z), a collection including concerts from 1996 and 2005 and unreleased solo songs. They also recorded Trial and Error, released on DVD in 2007 by the Fuenfundvierzig Label. This incarnation of the group has been extremely active, releasing several CD-Rs and DVD-Rs and touring extensively, including a very successful autumn 2005 UK tour, released in 2007 as ... In Autumn by Dirter. This release also features ex Henry Cow saxophonist/flautist Geoff Leigh, vocalist Lucianne Lassalle, poet Zoë Skoulding and the members of the Welsh group Ectogram. The trio of Diermaier, Péron and Cambuzat performed at a Rock in Opposition festival in France in April 2007. This trio lineup also recorded a new album entitled Disconnected which was mixed by Steven Stapleton and Colin Potter of Nurse with Wound. It was released to tie in with the 2007 Schiphorst Avant Garde festival in July 2007. C'est com... com... compliqué, the second album from these sessions was released in February 2009 on the Bureau B label. 

A 2009 BBC documentary on Krautrock featured interview segments with Péron and Diermaier. In 2011, in collaboration with the British artists Geraldine Swayne and James Johnston, the duo recorded a new Faust studio album, Something Dirty.

In 2010, Faust with members Hans Joachim Irmler, Steven Wray Lobdell, Lars Paukstat, Michael Stoll and Jan Fride released a new studio album, Faust Is Last, which happened to be the last studio album by Irmler's Faust.

After being absent from the band for 49 years, core member Gunther Wusthoff reunited with Werner "Zappi" Diermaier to play on the new 2022 Faust album, Daumenbruch. Pèron though is not present on the album as a musician. Members of Einsturzende Neubauten and Monobeat Original, another musical project of Diermaier, also play on the album.

Collaborations
During the Wümme years, Diermaier, Péron and Wüsthoff played on Slapp Happy's first two albums, Sort Of (1972) and Acnalbasac Noom (1973) which were also produced by Uwe Nettelbeck. Slapp Happy's Peter Blegvad had played with Faust in Wümme and subsequently toured with them in the UK. That tour also featured Uli Trepte, who had performed with Guru Guru and Neu!.

In contrast with Slapp Happy's song-based music, in 1972 Diermaier, Péron and Sosna also collaborated with the violinist Tony Conrad on Outside the Dream Syndicate; the record was released in 1973 at a low price in the UK and was, at the time, one of the few available examples of drone-based minimalism. A live recording from a 1995 concert, entitled Outside the Dream Syndicate Alive featuring Tony Conrad, Zappi Diermaier & Jean-Hervé Péron of Faust and Jim O'Rourke was released in Autumn 2005.

Faust collaborated with New Jersey avant-garde hip-hop crew Dälek for the album Derbe Respect, Alder in 2004.

Jean-Hervé Péron collaborated with THEME and Zsolt Sores on a MLP called 'Poison Is (Not) The Word' released on the Lumberton Trading Company label in 2012, and in 2013 Faust recorded 'Live at Clouds Hill' with Omar Rodríguez-López.

Faust performed with Slapp Happy again in November 2016 at the Week-End festival in Cologne, Germany. The two groups also played together in February 2017 at Cafe Oto in London.

In December 2017, Faust recorded a one-off collaboration with erotic-electronic artist Natalie Sharp, aka Lone Taxidermist, as part of the BBC Radio 3 programme Late Junctions "Late Junction Sessions" series.

Discography
Studio albums

Collaborations
 Outside the Dream Syndicate (1973) – collaboration with Tony Conrad
 Derbe Respect, Alder (2004) – collaboration with Dälek
 Outside the Dream Syndicate Alive (2005) – 1995 live collaboration with Tony Conrad
 Disconnected (2007) – collaboration album with Nurse with Wound
 Fini! (2008) - Jean-Herve Peron collaboration with Andrew Liles and Ragna Skinner
 Poison Is (Not) the Word (2012) – Jean-Herve Peron collaboration with THEME and Zsolt Sores
 ...Live at Clouds Hill (Vinylbox #3) (2013) – collaboration with Omar Rodríguez-López
 Festival Milhões de Festa (2017) - residency and live concert with GNOD

Singles
 "So Far" (1972) (re-issue in 2010)
 "Chemical Imbalance" (1990)
 "Überschall 1996" (1996) – split single with Stereolab and Foetus
 "Trafics" (1997) – split single with La Kuizine
 "Wir Brauchen Dich" (2001)

Compilations
 Munic and Elsewhere (1986)
 The Last LP: Faust Party No. 3, 1971–1972 (1988)
 71 Minutes of Faust (1988) – compilation of material from the above two
 Faust/Faust So Far (2000)
 The Wumme Years: 1970–1973 (2000)
 BBC Sessions + (2001)
 Faust 1971–1974 (2021) – 8xCD or 7xLP box set (includes unreleased album Punkt)

Live albums, and other releases
 Faust 5 (1975)  – never officially released, it exists only in the form of a Virgin Records promotional cassette
 Faust Concerts, Volume 1: Live in Hamburg, 1990 (1994)
 Faust Concerts, Volume 2: Live in London, 1992 (1994)
 BBC Sessions/Kisses for Pythagoras LP Lmt. Ed. (1996)
 Untitled (1996) – compilation of live and studio material
 Edinburgh 1997 [live] (1997)
 Land of Ukko & Rauni [live] (2000)
 Freispiel (2002) – remixes of Ravviviando
 Patchwork 1971–2002 (2002) – compilation of remixed and unreleased material
 Abzu (2003) – 4 CDs box with interviews and unreleased, live, solo and remixed tracks
 Collectif Met(z) (2005) – 3 CDs box + video CD
 Silver Monk Time (2006) – tribute album to The Monks by various artists; Faust contribute one track
 Live in Krakow 2006 (2007)
 ... In Autumn (2007) – 3 CDs box + 1 DVD, recorded 2005
 Od Serca Do Duszy [live] (2007) – 2xCD
 Kleine Welt [live] (2008) – Hans Joachim Irmler's Faust, recorded 2006
 Schiphorst 2008 [live] (2009) – recorded at the Schiphorst Festival
 Clouds Hill Hamburg Studio Sessions 2009 (2009) – CDR of rehearsals, recorded February 2009
 Live in Oslo (2009) – CDR
 WFMU Fest in Brooklyn [live] (2010) – recorded 1 October 2009
 Radical Mix (2012) – CDR, remix
 Momentaufnahme 1 (2023)
 Momentaufnahme 2 (2023)

Films
 Impressions (2006) – DVD
 Trial and Error (2007) – DVD, recorded 2005
 Faust: Nobody Knows If It Ever Happened (2007) – DVD on Ankst (live at The Garage, London, 1996)
 Klangbad: Avant-garde in the Meadows (2010) – DVD on Play Loud! Productions, Hans Joachim Irmler's Faust Faust: Live at Klangbad Festival (2010) – DVD on Play Loud! Productions, Hans Joachim Irmler's Faust'''
 Faust: Where Roads Cross (2013) – DVD on 6ème Droite
 Romantic Warriors IV: Krautrock (2019)

Further readingFaust: Stretch Out Time 1970–1975. Andy Wilson. Mute / The Faust-Pages, 2006. .Krautrocksampler. Julian Cope. Head Heritage 1997
The Wumme Years: 1970–1973 – accompanying booklet 2000

References

External links

The Faust Pages
jean-hervé péron
zappi diermaier
hans-joachim irmler
Video Report on OC-TV.net
Gunther Wüsthoff
"Interview: Krautrock legends Faust", The Guardian'', 18 October 2021

 
German experimental musical groups
Krautrock musical groups
Musical groups established in 1971
Virgin Records artists